Arnoldius pusillus is a species of ant part of the genus Arnoldius, which is only one of the three species described in it. The species is distributed in Australia. It was described by Mayr in 1876.

Subspecies
Arnoldius pusillus aequalis (Forel, 1902)

References

Dolichoderinae
Hymenoptera of Australia
Insects described in 1876